The Samoa National Party was a political party in Samoa which never gained parliamentary representation. The party was formed in 1999.

The party contested the 2000 Faleata West by-election sparked by the conviction of Toi Aukuso Cain for the assassination of Luagalau Levaula Kamu, coming third. It did not run any candidates at the 2001 Samoan general election.

The party was deregistered in February 2020 after not paying its registration fee.

References

Political parties in Samoa
Political parties disestablished in 2020